The 2014 Women's Six Nations Championship, also known as the 2014 RBS Women's Six Nations due to the tournament's sponsorship by the Royal Bank of Scotland, was the 13th series of the Women's Six Nations Championship, an annual women's rugby union competition between six European rugby union national teams. Matches were held in February and March 2014, on the same weekends as the men's tournament, if not always the same day.

The championship was contested by England, France, Ireland, Italy, Scotland and Wales.

Table

Fixtures and results

Week 1

Assistant referees:
Ken Henley-Willis (Ireland)
Susan Carty (Ireland)
Assessor:
Michel Lamoulie (France)

Assistant referees:
Cédric Jouvenoz (France)
Thomas Chereque (France)
Assessor:
Wayne Erickson (Australia)

Assistant referees:
Chris Williams (Wales)
Stuart Kibble (Wales)
Assessor:
n/a

Week 2

Assistant referees:
Helen O'Reilly (Ireland)
Aoife McCarthy (Ireland)
Assessor:
n/a

Assistant referees:
Maxime Rouquie (France)
Joachim Régis (France)
Assessor:
Carlos Molinari (Argentina)

Assistant referees:
Alex Pratt (Scotland)
Don MacPherson (Scotland)
Assessor:
Wayne Erickson (Australia)

Week 3

Assistant referees:
Claire Hodnett (England)
Tracey Pettingale (England)
Assessor:
Michel Lamoulie (France)

Assistant referees:
Maria Beatrice Benvenuti (Italy)
Maria Giovanna Pacifico (Italy)
Assessor:
Kate Todd (United States)

Assistant referees:
Greg Morgan (Wales)
Francesca Martin (Wales)
Assessor:
n/a

Week 4

Assistant referees:
Sara Cox (England)
Tracy Pettingale (England)
Assessor:
n/a

Assistant referees:
Helen O'Reilly (Ireland)
Susan Carty (Ireland)
Assessor:
n/a

Assistant referees:
Alex Pratt (Scotland)
Mhairi Hay (Scotland)
Assessor:
Kate Todd (United States)

Week 5

Assistant referees:
Guillaume Trieux (France)
Didier Mastoumecq (France)
Assessor:
Wayne Erickson (Australia)

Assistant referees:
Jason Langdon (Wales)
Francesca Martin (Wales)
Assessor:
n/a

Assistant referees:
Barbara Guastini (Italy)
Doranna De Carlini (Italy)
Assessor:
Michel Lamoulie (France)

Notes

External links
The official RBS Six Nations Site

2014
2014 rugby union tournaments for national teams
2013–14 in Irish rugby union
2013–14 in English rugby union
2013–14 in Welsh rugby union
2013–14 in Scottish rugby union
2013–14 in French rugby union
2013–14 in Italian rugby union
2013–14 in European women's rugby union
rugby union
rugby union
rugby union
rugby union
rugby union
Women
rugby union
Women's Six Nations
Women's Six Nations
Women's Six Nations